David Albertovich Baev (born November 7, 1997, in Vladikavkaz, North Ossetia-Alania) is a Russian freestyle wrestler of Ossetian descent who competes at 70 kilograms. In 2019, he claimed the World Cup, the Russian National Championship and the World Championship. Throughout the years, he has compiled a Ivan Yarygin Grand Prix silver medal (2020), a U23 World Championship silver medal (2018) and four Russian National Championships medals. In the age-group, he was a Cadet and Junior World Champion.

Wrestling career
Baev debuted at the 2017 Russian Championships in Nazran, Ingushetia; after losing to Magomed Dibirgadzhiev of Ivanovo Oblast in the semi-finals, he beat Karachay-Cherkassia's Alibek Akbaev by 6–4; Baev ultimately took third place. Baev also won the 2017 Junior World Championships in Tampere, Finland, after beating Rayan Deakin of the United States by technical fall (10-0). Baev once again won bronze in 2018 Nationals in Odintsovo.  David Baev has two younger brothers.

2019 Russian National Championships
In the 2019's edition of the Russian National Championships held in Sochi, Baev became champion in the 70 kg weight class. In the round of 16, Baev faced Krasnodar representative, Ismail Dzhapua, and won by technical superiority by 10–0, without conceding a single point. Baev then faced Krasnoyarsk's Semen Tereshenko who he won by 5-0 points. In the quarter-final, Baev faced former Ivan Yarygin gold medalist and two-time Russian national silver medalist, Israil Kasumov of Chechnya.

Baev won the quarter-final match with a technical fall by a score of 13–2, advancing to the semi-finals, where he defeated Evgeny Zherbaev of Buryatia by another technical fall with a 15–4 score. After an exhaustive-paced match, Baev defeated Razambek Zhamalov and was declared the winner by criteria with a score of 10*-10, for he scored with the highest-scoring technique of the match – a 4-point takedown in the first period, shortly after Baev was put on the shot-clock.  With two-time World Champion Magomedrasul Gazimagomedov moving up to 74 kg, Baev won the right to represent Russia at the 2019 World Wrestling Championships held in Nursultan, Kazakhstan.

2019 World Championships
Baev competed in the 70 kg weight category and won his first senior World title. Baev first defeated Andrei Karpach of Belarus by a technical fall, 10–0. Then, Baev was matched against former World Champion, Zurabi Iakobishvili, who he defeated by a score of 7–0. Baev progressed to the quarter-finals where he faced Asian Champion and World and Olympic medalist Ikhtiyor Navruzov of Uzbekistan, who he also defeated, 11–5. Next, Baev faced World silver medalist and European Champion, Magomedmurad Gadzhiev. Baev was able to score two-points on a takedown, and another two-points on a re-attack, resulting to a score of 5–2.

In the final match against Nurkozha Kaipanov, Baev's opponent reversed and scored exposure for two-points. Baev did the same and added a gut-wrench, increasing to a score of 4–2. He then attacked with a four-point single leg and again got additional two-further-points from a trapped-arm gut-wrench. Going into the second period, Baev was up 10–2, and after thirty seconds, Baev again used his single leg to gain a further four-points in what resulted in a technical fall win, earning Baev the 2019 world title.

Freestyle record

! colspan="7"| International Freestyle Matches
|-
!  Res.
!  Record
!  Opponent
!  Score
!  Date
!  Event
!  Location
|-
! style=background:white colspan=7 |
|-
|Loss
|46–12
|align=left| Murshid Mutalimov
|style="font-size:88%"|2–8
|style="font-size:88%" rowspan=2|March 13–14, 2021
|style="font-size:88%" rowspan=2|2021 Russian National Freestyle Wrestling Championships
|style="text-align:left;font-size:88%;" rowspan=2|
 Ulan-Ude, Russia
|-
|Win
|46–11
|align=left| Akhmed Kasumov
|style="font-size:88%"|TF 11–0
|-
! style=background:white colspan=7 |
|-
|Loss
|45–11
|align=left| Ilyas Bekbulatov
|style="font-size:88%"|4–6
|style="font-size:88%" rowspan=3|January 25, 2021
|style="font-size:88%" rowspan=3|WLR Pro League I
|style="text-align:left;font-size:88%;" rowspan=3|
 Russia
|-
|Win
|45–10
|align=left| Inalbek Sheriev
|style="font-size:88%"|9–5
|-
|Win
|44–10
|align=left| Kurban Shiraev
|style="font-size:88%"|6–4
|-
! style=background:white colspan=7 |
|-
|Loss
|43–10
|align=left| Chermen Valiev
|style="font-size:88%"|2–4
|style="font-size:88%" rowspan=5|October 16–18, 2020
|style="font-size:88%" rowspan=5|2020 Russian National Freestyle Wrestling Championships
|style="text-align:left;font-size:88%;" rowspan=5|
 Naro-Fominsk, Russia
|-
|Win
|43–9
|align=left| Arbak Sat
|style="font-size:88%"|8–3
|-
|Win
|42–9
|align=left| Kurban Shiraev
|style="font-size:88%"|8–0
|-
|Win
|41–9
|align=left| Abdullagadzhi Magomedov
|style="font-size:88%"|TF 11–0
|-
|Win
|40–9
|align=left| Imam Ganishev
|style="font-size:88%"|5–3
|-
! style=background:white colspan=7 |
|-
|Loss
|39–9
|align=left| Israil Kasumov
|style="font-size:88%"|5–6
|style="font-size:88%" rowspan=4|January 23–26, 2020
|style="font-size:88%" rowspan=4|Golden Grand Prix Ivan Yarygin 2020
|style="text-align:left;font-size:88%;" rowspan=4|
 Krasnoyarsk, Russia
|-
|Win
|39–8
|align=left| Evgenii Zherbaev
|style="font-size:88%"|13–6
|-
|Win
|38–8
|align=left| Arbak Sat
|style="font-size:88%"|Fall
|-
|Win
|37–8
|align=left| Oyungerel Ganbayar
|style="font-size:88%"|TF 10–0
|-
! style=background:white colspan=7 |
|-
|Win
|36–8
|align=left| Nurkozha Kaipanov
|style="font-size:88%"|TF 14–2
|style="font-size:88%" rowspan=5|September 19–20, 2019
|style="font-size:88%" rowspan=5|2019 World Wrestling Championships
|style="text-align:left;font-size:88%;" rowspan=5|
 Nur-Sultan, Kazakhstan
|-
|Win
|35–8
|align=left| Magomedmurad Gadzhiev
|style="font-size:88%"|5–2
|-
|Win
|34–8
|align=left| Ikhtiyor Navruzov
|style="font-size:88%"|11–5
|-
|Win
|33–8
|align=left| Zurabi Iakobishvili
|style="font-size:88%"|7–0
|-
|Win
|32–8
|align=left| Mihai Sava
|style="font-size:88%"|10–1
|-
! style=background:white colspan=7 |
|-
|Win
|31–8
|align=left| Razambek Zhamalov
|style="font-size:88%"|10–10
|style="font-size:88%" rowspan=5|July 4, 2019
|style="font-size:88%" rowspan=5|2019 Russian National Freestyle Wrestling Championships
|style="text-align:left;font-size:88%;" rowspan=5|
 Sochi, Russia
|-
|Win
|30–8
|align=left| Yevgeny Zherbaev
|style="font-size:88%"|TF 15–4
|-
|Win
|29–8
|align=left| Israil Kasumov
|style="font-size:88%"|TF 13–2
|-
|Win
|28–8
|align=left| Semen Tereshchenko
|style="font-size:88%"|5–0
|-
|Win
|27–8
|align=left| Ismail Dzhapua
|style="font-size:88%"|TF 10–0
|-
! style=background:white colspan=7 | 
|-
|Loss
|26–8
|align=left| Chermen Valiev
|style="font-size:88%"|5–6
|style="font-size:88%" rowspan=3|May 1–3, 2019
|style="font-size:88%" rowspan=3|2019 Ali Aliev International
|style="text-align:left;font-size:88%;" rowspan=3|
 Kaspiysk, Russia
|-
|Win
|26–7
|align=left| Ali-Pasha Umarpashaev
|style="font-size:88%"|11–2
|-
|Win
|25–7
|align=left| Dmitrii Malencov
|style="font-size:88%"|TF 10–0
|-
! style=background:white colspan=7 |
|-
|Win
|24–7
|align=left| Meisam Nassiri
|style="font-size:88%"|6–1
|style="font-size:88%" rowspan=2|March 16–17, 2019
|style="font-size:88%" rowspan=2|2019 Wrestling World Cup - Men's freestyle
|style="text-align:left;font-size:88%;" rowspan=2| Yakutsk, Russia
|-
|Win
|23–7
|align=left| Franklin Marén
|style="font-size:88%"|TF 10–0
|-
! style=background:white colspan=7 | 
|-
|Loss
|22–7
|align=left| Razambek Zhamalov
|style="font-size:88%"|4–8
|style="font-size:88%" rowspan=4|January 24, 2019
|style="font-size:88%" rowspan=4|Golden Grand Prix Ivan Yarygin 2019
|style="text-align:left;font-size:88%;" rowspan=4|
 Krasnoyarsk, Russia
|-
|Loss
|22–6
|align=left| Magomedrasul Gazimagomedov
|style="font-size:88%"|2–2
|-
|Win
|22–5
|align=left| James Green
|style="font-size:88%"|10–2
|-
|Win
|21–5
|align=left| Temuulen Enkhtuya
|style="font-size:88%"|TF 14–2
|-
! style=background:white colspan=7 | 
|-
|Win
|20–5
|align=left| Magomed Kurbanaliev
|style="font-size:88%"|5–3
|style="font-size:88%" rowspan=4|December 7–9, 2018
|style="font-size:88%" rowspan=4|2018 Alans International
|style="text-align:left;font-size:88%;" rowspan=4|
 Vladikavkaz, Russia
|-
|Win
|19–5
|align=left| James Green
|style="font-size:88%"|8–6
|-
|Win
|18–5
|align=left| Alibek Akbaev
|style="font-size:88%"|4–1
|-
|Win
|17–5
|align=left| Josh Kindig
|style="font-size:88%"|TF 14–4
|-
! style=background:white colspan=7 |
|-
|Loss
|16–5
|align=left| Tajmuraz Salkazanov
|style="font-size:88%"|1–9
|style="font-size:88%" rowspan=5|November 12–18, 2018
|style="font-size:88%" rowspan=5|2018 U23 World Wrestling Championships
|style="text-align:left;font-size:88%;" rowspan=5|
 Bucharest, Romania
|-
|Win
|16–4
|align=left| Enes Uslu
|style="font-size:88%"|7–6
|-
|Win
|15–4
|align=left| Ramazan İbadov
|style="font-size:88%"|TF 10–0
|-
|Win
|14–4
|align=left| Hayden Hidlay
|style="font-size:88%"|6–5
|-
|Win
|13–4
|align=left| Aidyn Tazhigali
|style="font-size:88%"|TF 10–0
|-
! style=background:white colspan=7 | 
|-
|Win
|12–4
|align=left| Aghahuseyn Mustafayev
|style="font-size:88%"|TF 10–0
|style="font-size:88%" rowspan=4|September 12–14, 2018
|style="font-size:88%" rowspan=4|2018 Alexandr Medved Prizes
|style="text-align:left;font-size:88%;" rowspan=4|
 Minsk, Belarus
|-
|Win
|11–4
|align=left| Andriy Kviatkovskyi
|style="font-size:88%"|3–0
|-
|Win
|10–4
|align=left| Islambek Orozbekov
|style="font-size:88%"|TF 10–0
|-
|Win
|9–4
|align=left| Aleksey Boruta
|style="font-size:88%"|TF 12–0
|-
! style=background:white colspan=7 | 
|-
|Win
|8–4
|align=left| Razambek Zhamalov
|style="font-size:88%"|4–3
|style="font-size:88%" rowspan=2|Augst 3–5, 2018
|style="font-size:88%" rowspan=2|2018 Russian National Freestyle Wrestling Championships
|style="text-align:left;font-size:88%;" rowspan=2|
 Odintsovo, Russia
|-
|Loss
|7–4
|align=left| Magomedrasul Gazimagomedov
|style="font-size:88%"|3–6
|-
! style=background:white colspan=7 |
|-
|Loss
|7–3
|align=left| Israil Kasumov
|style="font-size:88%"|TF 0–11
|style="font-size:88%" rowspan=2|October 7, 2017
|style="font-size:88%" rowspan=2|2017 Akhmat Kadyrov Cup
|style="text-align:left;font-size:88%;" rowspan=2|
 Grozny, Russia
|-
|Win
|7–2
|align=left| Murad Kuramagomedov
|style="font-size:88%"|TF 11-0
|-
! style=background:white colspan=7 | 
|-
|Win
|6–2
|align=left| Alibek Akbaev
|style="font-size:88%"|6–4
|style="font-size:88%" rowspan=5|June 12, 2017
|style="font-size:88%" rowspan=5|2017 Russian National Freestyle Wrestling Championships
|style="text-align:left;font-size:88%;" rowspan=5|
 Nazran, Russia
|-
|Loss
|5–2
|align=left| Magomed Dibirgadzhiev
|style="font-size:88%"|13–17
|-
|Win
|5–1
|align=left| Magomed Kurbanaliev
|style="font-size:88%"|10–10
|-
|Win
|4–1
|align=left| Zaur Tokaev
|style="font-size:88%"|4–2
|-
|Win
|3–1
|align=left| Dmitiy Merenkov
|style="font-size:88%"|7–2
|-
! style=background:white colspan=7 | 
|-
|Loss
|2–1
|align=left| Alan Gogaev
|style="font-size:88%"|2–6
|style="font-size:88%" rowspan=3|January 27–29, 2017
|style="font-size:88%" rowspan=3|Golden Grand Prix Ivan Yarygin 2017
|style="text-align:left;font-size:88%;" rowspan=3|
 Krasnoyarsk, Russia
|-
|Win
|2–0
|align=left| Shikhsaid Dzhalilov
|style="font-size:88%"|TF 10–0
|-
|Win
|1–0
|align=left| Magomed Magomedov
|style="font-size:88%"|TF 11–0
|-

References 

1997 births
Living people
Russian male sport wrestlers
World Wrestling Championships medalists
People from Vladikavkaz
21st-century Russian people